The Arc of the Covenant or The Cathedral is a sculpture by the French artist Auguste Rodin, conceived in 1908.

Description
It shows two intertwined right hands belonging to two different figures.

Versions
Originally carved in stone, it was later cast in various editions in bronze.

See also
List of sculptures by Auguste Rodin

Notes

References

External links

Sculptures by Auguste Rodin
1908 sculptures
Sculptures of the Museo Soumaya
Stone sculptures
Bronze sculptures